Queensland Gaelic Football and Hurling Association (QGFHA) was established in 1975. It is the ruling body for Gaelic football and hurling in the Australian state of Queensland. The QGFHA is affiliated to the Australasia GAA.

The QGFHA runs men's and ladies' football matches and hurling and camogie matches at Gaelic Park in Willawong. 

State representative teams are sent to the Australasian Championships every year with men's senior and minors, and women's teams, competing.

Clubs
Gaelic football
 Harps (M/L)
 East Celts (M/L)
 John Mitchel's (M/L)
 Souths (M/L)
 Gold Coast Gaels (M/L)
 Shamrocks (L)

Brisbane Hurling and Camogie Club

Hurling 
 Na Fianna 
 Emeralds
 Cú Chulainns

Camogie  
 Eire Og
 Naomh Padraig
 Tara Gaels

Clubs no longer in existence 
 Wests
 Norths 
 Sarsfields

See also

References

External links
 

Gaelic Football
Australasia GAA
Gaelic games governing bodies in Australia
1975 establishments in Australia
Sports organizations established in 1975